Hyposmocoma saccophora is a species of moth of the family Cosmopterigidae. It is endemic to Oahu. The type locality is Mount Kaala, where it was collected on an altitude of 3,000 feet.

The larva probably feed on lichens, algae or fungi growing on damp rocks.

Larval case
The larval case is in the form of a somewhat stout thorn. It is whitish, mottled with greyish fuscous, and with a straight opening at the larger extremity which is fitted with a lid, like the operculum of a univalve mollusc.

The case is made by incorporating large numbers of small sand grains in a silk matrix. They are between 9.5 and 10 mm long and are bicolored, pale beneath and dark above. The differences in colour are obtained by more completely enclosing the sand grains in pale silk in the paler areas and leaving more of the grains exposed to form the darker dorsum.

The head end of the larval case is closed by an operculum. On the underside of the operculum the larva spins a mat of silk. This may be grasped by the mandibles of the larva and pulled down to close the aperture. The larva attaches stone weights to the top of the operculum, assisting in the closing of the operculum.

The larva must enlarge its case several times as it grows to maturity. Each time it extends the case it must remove the stone weights from the top of the operculum, push the operculum upward and incorporate it into the structure of the roof, build a new operculum, and attach a new set of stone weights.

When full-grown, the larva uses silk to attach the case by the head end to the rock, and it then hangs tail downward to pupate.

The anterior parts of the body of the larva are more heavily sclerotized and pigmented. The thoracic legs are quite long, and the larva bears great resemblance to the larvae of Trichoptera.

References

saccophora
Endemic moths of Hawaii
Moths described in 1907
Taxa named by Thomas de Grey, 6th Baron Walsingham